The 1888 Lafayette football team was an American football team that represented Lafayette College as an independent during the 1888 college football season. Playing without a regular coach, the team compiled a 6–3 record and outscored opponents by a total of 141 to 67. Everet Camp was the team captain, and H. Fay was the manager. The team played its home games on The Quad in Easton, Pennsylvania.

Schedule

References

Lafayette
Lafayette Leopards football seasons
Lafayette football